Shannon McIntosh (born July 24, 1989) is an American auto racing driver who competes in the ARCA Racing Series, recently competing for Cunningham Motorsports. She previously raced in the U.S. F2000 National Championship for Pabst Racing Services and with Cape Motorsports with Wayne Taylor Racing in 2011. She also drove for car builder and owner Bob East in 2010 in the USAC Midgets.

Born and raised in Miamisburg, Ohio, McIntosh began her racing career at age 5 and has amassed over 100 combined victories through Quarter Midgets and USAC Midgets. In 2012, McIntosh was the only female competitor in the US F2000 National Championship and the only American female in The Road to Indy. McIntosh has been sponsored by companies like TrueCar and TAG Heuer while adorning a racing suit by AlpineStars and uses Arai Helmet.

Recently, McIntosh partnered with Dallas Mavericks owner and American businessman Mark Cuban with the social media app called Cyber Dust.

McIntosh competed for the October 2011 cover of Seventeen as one of five finalists chosen from 35,000 applicants which also included a docu-reality special on MTV.

She finished eighth in the 2011 U.S. F2000 National Championship Her best race finish was eighth (twice) and 18th in the 2012 U.S. F2000 National Championship, scoring a best finish of eleventh.

After working diligently for a drive during the 2013 season, McIntosh earned an opportunity to race part-time in the ARCA Racing Series for Cunningham Motorsports. Competing in the Scott Get Geared Up 200 at Lucas Oil Raceway at Indianapolis, McIntosh drove from 29th to score a respectable 15th-place finish in the race.

Motorsports career results

ARCA Racing Series
(key) (Bold – Pole position awarded by qualifying time. Italics – Pole position earned by points standings or practice time. * – Most laps led.)

References

External links 

1989 births
American female racing drivers
People from Miamisburg, Ohio
Living people
Racing drivers from Dayton, Ohio
Racing drivers from Ohio
ARCA Menards Series drivers
U.S. F2000 National Championship drivers
Wayne Taylor Racing drivers